The 2014 San Antonio Scorpions FC season is the club's third season of existence, and its third consecutive season in the North American Soccer League, the second division of the American soccer pyramid. Including the San Antonio Thunder soccer franchise of the original NASL, this was the 5th season of professional soccer in San Antonio.

Competitions

Pre-season

deeproot Funds Cup

International Friendlies

NASL Spring Season 

The spring season will last for 9 games beginning on April 12 and ending on June 8. The schedule will feature a single round robin format with each team playing every other team in the league a single time. Half the teams will host 5 home games and play 4 road games whereas the other half of the teams will play 4 home games and 5 road games. The winner of the spring Season will automatically qualify for the 2014 NASL Playoffs (The Championship).

Standings

Results

Results by round

Matches 
Kickoff times are in CDT (UTC−05) unless shown otherwise

Awards

Mid-season friendlies

NASL Fall Season 

The fall season will last for 18 games beginning on July 12 and ending on November 1.  The schedule will feature a double round robin format with each team playing every other team in the league twice, one at home and one on the road. The winner of the fall season will automatically qualify for the 2014 NASL Playoffs (The Championship).

Standings

Results

Results by round

Matches 
Kickoff times are in CDT (UTC−05) unless shown otherwise

Awards

NASL Playoffs 
Soccer Bowl 2014 will be contested by the winners of the spring and fall seasons hosting the next best two teams in the full year regular season table. The half-season champions will earn the #1 & #2 seeds, with the higher seed going to the team with the better full-season record. The two next-best teams will earn the #3 & #4 seeds. In the event that the same team wins both half-season championships, they will be the #1 seed, with seeds 2-4 going to the three next-best full-season teams. The #1 seed will host the #4 seed and the #2 seed will host the #3 seed in the semi-finals. The winners will meet in the Championship game (Soccer Bowl 2014), hosted by the team with the higher seed.

Lamar Hunt U.S. Open Cup

References 

San Antonio Scorpions seasons
San Antonio Scorpions Football Club
2014 in sports in Texas